The Kohima Science College, Jotsoma (KSCJ) is an autonomous government institute for undergraduate  and postgraduate science education located at Jotsoma in the state of Nagaland, India. The college was established in 1961 with science education in higher secondary and under graduate levels.

Kohima Science College has about 2000 students (as of 2021) enrolled in collegiate undergraduate and graduate programs and served by about 100 academic faculty and staff with a teacher to student ratio of 1:20.

Campus

Presently, three portions, about 50 acres altogether, have been carved out to house a water reservoir, Doordharshan Kendra Kohima and music academy.

Departments
Department of Anthropology
Department of Botany
Department of Chemistry
Department of Computer Science
Department of English
Department of Geography
Department of Geology
Department of Mathematics
Department of Physics
Department of Statistics
Department of Tenyidie
Department of Zoology

Administration
Principal: Lily Sema

Vice Principal: Thungbeni Yanthan

Founding members:
 Neilhouzhü K. Angami, Chairman
 John Bosco Jasokie, General Secretary
 Keduonyü Sekhose, Organizing Secretary
 Vizol Angami, Member
 Haizotuo Munshi, Member
 U.M. Deb, Treasurer
 Akum Imlong, Member

Library
The college is endowed with a number of libraries to meet the informative needs of the students and faculty. It has a large repository of books, journals, national and international magazines, newspapers, past exam question papers and project reports.

The college is a registered user of UGC-NLIST (National Library and Information Services Infrastructure for Scholarly Content) Programme, a project funded by the Ministry of Human Resources Development under its National Mission on Education through ICT. The N-LIST project provides access to more than 3800 journals, 80000 electronic books and bibliographic databases to students, researchers and faculty, and also allows authorized users to download articles directly from the publisher's website.

References

External links
 Kohima Science College Official website

Education in Kohima
1961 establishments in Assam
Colleges affiliated to Nagaland University
Educational institutions established in 1961
Kohima district
Science colleges in India
Universities and colleges in Nagaland